The list of ship decommissionings in 1968 includes a chronological list of all ships decommissioned in 1968.


See also 

1968
 Ship decommissionings
Ship